

Events

Pre-1600
1 BC – Wang Mang consolidates his power in China and is declared marshal of state. Emperor Ai of Han, who died the previous day, had no heirs.
 942 – Start of the four-day Battle of al-Mada'in, between the Hamdanids of Mosul and the Baridis of Basra over control of the Abbasid capital, Baghdad.
 963 – Nikephoros II Phokas is crowned emperor of the Byzantine Empire.
1328 – The House of Gonzaga seizes power in the Duchy of Mantua, and will rule until 1708.
1513 – Battle of the Spurs (Battle of Guinegate): King Henry VIII of England and his Imperial allies defeat French Forces who are then forced to retreat.
1570 – The Principality of Transylvania is established after John II Zápolya renounces his claim as King of Hungary in the Treaty of Speyer.

1601–1900
1652 – Battle of Plymouth: Inconclusive naval action between the fleets of Michiel de Ruyter and George Ayscue in the First Anglo-Dutch War.
1777 – American Revolutionary War: The Americans led by General John Stark rout British and Brunswick troops under Friedrich Baum at the Battle of Bennington in Walloomsac, New York.
1780 – American Revolutionary War: Battle of Camden: The British defeat the Americans near Camden, South Carolina.
1792 – Maximilien de Robespierre presents the petition of the Commune of Paris to the Legislative Assembly, which demanded the formation of a revolutionary tribunal.
1793 – French Revolution: A levée en masse is decreed by the National Convention.
1812 – War of 1812: American General William Hull surrenders Fort Detroit without a fight to the British Army.
1819 – Peterloo Massacre: Seventeen people die and over 600 are injured in cavalry charges at a public meeting at St. Peter's Field, Manchester, England.
1841 – U.S. President John Tyler vetoes a bill which called for the re-establishment of the Second Bank of the United States. Enraged Whig Party members riot outside the White House in the most violent demonstration on White House grounds in U.S. history.
1858 – U.S. President James Buchanan inaugurates the new transatlantic telegraph cable by exchanging greetings with Queen Victoria of the United Kingdom. However, a weak signal forces a shutdown of the service in a few weeks.
1859 – The Grand Duchy of Tuscany formally deposes the exiled House of Lorraine.
1863 – The Dominican Restoration War begins when Gregorio Luperón raises the Dominican flag in Santo Domingo after Spain had recolonized the country.
1869 – Battle of Acosta Ñu: A Paraguayan battalion largely made up of children is massacred by the Brazilian Army during the Paraguayan War.
1870 – Franco-Prussian War: The Battle of Mars-la-Tour is fought, resulting in a Prussian victory.
1876 – Richard Wagner's Siegfried, the penultimate opera in his Ring cycle, premieres at the Bayreuth Festspielhaus.
1891 – The Basilica of San Sebastian, Manila, the first all-steel church in Asia, is officially inaugurated and blessed.
1896 – Skookum Jim Mason, George Carmack and Dawson Charlie discover gold in a tributary of the Klondike River in Canada, setting off the Klondike Gold Rush.
1900 – The Battle of Elands River during the Second Boer War ends after a 13-day siege is lifted by the British. The battle had begun when a force of between 2,000 and 3,000 Boers had surrounded a force of 500 Australians, Rhodesians, Canadians and British soldiers at a supply dump at Brakfontein Drift.

1901–present
1906 – The 8.2  Valparaíso earthquake hits central Chile, killing 3,882 people.
1913 – Tōhoku Imperial University of Japan (modern day Tohoku University) becomes the first university in Japan to admit female students.
  1913   – Completion of the Royal Navy battlecruiser .
1916 – The Migratory Bird Treaty between Canada and the United States is signed.
1918 – The Battle of Lake Baikal was fought between the Czechoslovak Legion and the Red Army.
1920 – US baseball player Ray Chapman of the Cleveland Indians is hit on the head by a fastball thrown by Carl Mays of the New York Yankees. Next day, Chapman will become the second player to die from injuries sustained in a Major League Baseball game.
  1920   – The congress of the Communist Party of Bukhara opens. The congress would call for armed revolution.
  1920   – Polish–Soviet War: The Battle of Radzymin concludes; the Soviet Red Army is forced to turn away from Warsaw.
1923 – The United Kingdom gives the name "Ross Dependency" to part of its claimed Antarctic territory and makes the Governor-General of the Dominion of New Zealand its administrator.
1927 – The Dole Air Race begins from Oakland, California, to Honolulu, Hawaii, during which six out of the eight participating planes crash or disappear.
1929 – The 1929 Palestine riots break out in Mandatory Palestine between Palestinian Arabs and Jews and continue until the end of the month. In total, 133 Jews and 116 Arabs are killed.
1930 – The first color sound cartoon, Fiddlesticks, is released by Ub Iwerks.
  1930   – The first British Empire Games are opened in Hamilton, Ontario, by the Governor General of Canada, the Viscount Willingdon.
1933 – Christie Pits riot takes place in Toronto, Ontario. 
1942 – World War II: US Navy L-class blimp L-8 drifts in from the Pacific and eventually crashes in Daly City, California. The two-man crew cannot be found.
1944 – First flight of a jet with forward-swept wings, the Junkers Ju 287.
1945 – The National Representatives' Congress, the precursor of the current National Assembly of Vietnam, convenes in Sơn Dương.
1946 – Mass riots in Kolkata begin; more than 4,000 people would be killed in 72 hours.
  1946   – The All Hyderabad Trade Union Congress is founded in Secunderabad.
1954 – The first issue of Sports Illustrated is published. 
1960 – Cyprus gains its independence from the United Kingdom.
1964 – Vietnam War: A coup d'état replaces Dương Văn Minh with General Nguyễn Khánh as President of South Vietnam. A new constitution is established with aid from the U.S. Embassy.
1966 – Vietnam War: The House Un-American Activities Committee begins investigations of Americans who have aided the Viet Cong. The committee intends to introduce legislation making these activities illegal. Anti-war demonstrators disrupt the meeting and 50 people are arrested.
1972 – In an unsuccessful coup d'état attempt, the Royal Moroccan Air Force fires upon Hassan II of Morocco's plane while he is traveling back to Rabat
1975 – Australian Prime Minister Gough Whitlam symbolically hands over land to the Gurindji people after the eight-year Wave Hill walk-off, a landmark event in the history of Indigenous land rights in Australia, commemorated in a 1991 song by Paul Kelly and an annual celebration.
1987 – Northwest Airlines Flight 255, a McDonnell Douglas MD-82, crashes after takeoff in Detroit, Michigan, killing 154 of the 155 on board, plus two people on the ground.
1989 – A solar particle event affects computers at the Toronto Stock Exchange, forcing a halt to trading.
1991 – Indian Airlines Flight 257, a Boeing 737-200, crashes during approach to Imphal Airport, killing all 69 people on board.
2005 – West Caribbean Airways Flight 708, a McDonnell Douglas MD-82, crashes in Machiques, Venezuela, killing all 160 people on board.
2010 – AIRES Flight 8250 crashes at Gustavo Rojas Pinilla International Airport in San Andrés, San Andrés y Providencia, Colombia, killing two people.
2012 – South African police fatally shoot 34 miners and wound 78 more during an industrial dispute at Marikana near Rustenburg.
2013 – The ferry St. Thomas Aquinas collides with a cargo ship and sinks at Cebu, Philippines, killing 61 people with 59 others missing.
2015 – More than 96 people are killed and hundreds injured following a series of air-raids by the Syrian Arab Air Force on the rebel-held market town of Douma.
  2015   – Trigana Air Flight 267, an ATR 42, crashes in Oksibl, Pegunungan Bintang, killing all 54 people on board.
2020 – The August Complex fire in California burns more than one million acres of land.

Births

Pre-1600
1355 – Philippa, 5th Countess of Ulster (d. 1382)
1378 – Hongxi Emperor of China (d. 1425)
1401 – Jacqueline, Countess of Hainaut (d. 1436)
1557 – Agostino Carracci, Italian painter and etcher (d. 1602)
1565 – Christina, Grand Duchess of Tuscany (d. 1637)
1573 – Anne of Austria, Queen of Poland (d. 1598)

1601–1900
1637 – Countess Emilie Juliane of Barby-Mühlingen (d. 1706)
1645 – Jean de La Bruyère, French philosopher and author (d. 1696)
1650 – Vincenzo Coronelli, Italian monk, cosmographer, and cartographer (d. 1718)
1682 – Louis, Duke of Burgundy (d. 1712)
1744 – Pierre Méchain, French astronomer and surveyor (d. 1804)
1761 – Yevstigney Fomin, Russian pianist and composer (d. 1800)
1815 – John Bosco, Italian priest and educator (d. 1888)
1816 – Octavia Taylor, daughter of Zachary Taylor (d. 1820)
1820 – Andrew Rainsford Wetmore, Canadian lawyer and politician, 1st Premier of New Brunswick (d. 1892)
1821 – Arthur Cayley, English mathematician and academic (d. 1895)
1831 – John Jones Ross, Canadian lawyer and politician, 7th Premier of Quebec (d. 1901)
1832 – Wilhelm Wundt, German physician, psychologist, and physiologist (d. 1920)
1842 – Jakob Rosanes, Ukrainian-German mathematician, chess player, and academic (d. 1922)
1845 – Gabriel Lippmann, Luxembourger-French physicist and academic, Nobel Prize laureate (d. 1921)
1848 – Vladimir Sukhomlinov, Russian general (d. 1926)
1855 – James McGowen, Australian politician, 18th Premier of New South Wales (d. 1922)
1856 – Aparicio Saravia, Uruguayan general and politician (d. 1904)
1858 – Arthur Achleitner, German author (d. 1927)
1860 – Martin Hawke, 7th Baron Hawke, English-Scottish cricketer (d. 1938)
  1860   – Jules Laforgue, Uruguayan-French poet and author (d. 1887)
1862 – Amos Alonzo Stagg, American baseball player and coach (d. 1965)
1864 – Elsie Inglis, Scottish surgeon and suffragette (d. 1917)
1865 – Mary Gilmore, Australian socialist, poet and journalist (d. 1962)
1868 – Bernarr Macfadden, American bodybuilder and publisher, founded Macfadden Publications (d. 1955)
1876 – Ivan Bilibin, Russian illustrator and stage designer (d. 1942)
1877 – Roque Ruaño, Spanish priest and engineer (d. 1935)
1882 – Désiré Mérchez, French swimmer and water polo player (d. 1968)
1884 – Hugo Gernsback, Luxembourger-American author and publisher (d. 1967)
1888 – T. E. Lawrence, British colonel, diplomat, writer and archaeologist (d. 1935)
  1888   – Armand J. Piron, American violinist, composer, and bandleader (d. 1943)
1892 – Hal Foster, Canadian-American author and illustrator (d. 1982)
  1892   – Otto Messmer, American cartoonist and animator, co-created Felix the Cat (d. 1983)
1894 – George Meany, American plumber and labor leader (d. 1980)
1895 – Albert Cohen, Greek-Swiss author and playwright (d. 1981)
  1895   – Liane Haid, Austrian-Swiss actress and singer (d. 2000)
1900 – Ida Browne, Australian geologist and palaeontologist (d. 1976)

1901–present
1902 – Georgette Heyer, English author (d. 1974)
  1902   – Wallace Thurman, American author and playwright (d. 1934)
1904 – Minoru Genda, Japanese general, pilot, and politician (d. 1989)
  1904   – Wendell Meredith Stanley, American biochemist and virologist, Nobel Prize laureate (d. 1971)
1908 – Orlando Cole, American cellist and educator (d. 2010)
  1908   – William Keepers Maxwell, Jr., American editor, novelist, short story writer, and essayist (d. 2000)
1909 – Paul Callaway, American organist and conductor (d. 1995)
1910 – Gloria Blondell, American actress (d. 1986)
  1910   – Mae Clarke, American actress (d. 1992)
1911 – E. F. Schumacher, German economist and statistician (d. 1977)
1912 – Ted Drake, English footballer and manager (d. 1995)
1913 – Menachem Begin, Belarusian-Israeli politician, Prime Minister of Israel, Nobel Prize laureate (d. 1992)
1915 – Al Hibbler, American baritone singer (d. 2001)
1916 – Iggy Katona, American race car driver (d. 2003)
1917 – Matt Christopher, American author (d. 1997)
  1917   – Roque Cordero, Panamanian composer and educator (d. 2008)
1919 – Karl-Heinz Euling, German captain (d. 2014)
1920 – Charles Bukowski, German-American poet, novelist, and short story writer (d. 1994)
1922 – James Casey, English comedian, radio scriptwriter and producer (d. 2011)
  1922   – Ernie Freeman, American pianist and bandleader (d. 2001)
1923 – Millôr Fernandes, Brazilian journalist and playwright (d. 2012)
1924 – Fess Parker, American actor (d. 2010)
  1924   – Inez Voyce, American baseball player (d. 2022)
1925 – Willie Jones, American baseball player (d. 1983)
  1925   – Mal Waldron, American pianist and composer (d. 2002)
1927 – Lois Nettleton, American actress (d. 2008)
1928 – Ann Blyth, American actress and singer
  1928   – Eydie Gormé, American singer (d. 2013)
  1928   – Ara Güler, Turkish photographer and journalist (d. 2018)
  1928   – Eddie Kirkland, American singer-songwriter and guitarist (d. 2011)
  1928   – Wyatt Tee Walker, American pastor, theologian, and activist (d. 2018)
1929 – Bill Evans, American pianist and composer (d. 1980)
  1929   – Helmut Rahn, German footballer (d. 2003)
  1929   – Fritz Von Erich, American wrestler and trainer (d. 1997)
1930 – Robert Culp, American actor, director, and screenwriter (d. 2010)
  1930   – Frank Gifford, American football player, sportscaster, and actor (d. 2015)
  1930   – Leslie Manigat, Haitian educator and politician, 43rd President of Haiti (d. 2014)
  1930   – Flor Silvestre, Mexican singer and actress (d. 2020)
1933 – Reiner Kunze, German poet and translator
  1933   – Tom Maschler, English author and publisher (d. 2020)
  1933   – Julie Newmar, American actress
  1933   – Stuart Roosa, American colonel, pilot, and astronaut (d. 1994)
1934 – Angela Buxton, British tennis player (d. 2020)
  1934   – Diana Wynne Jones, English author (d. 2011)
  1934   – Douglas Kirkland, Canadian-American photographer (d. 2022)
  1934   – Ketty Lester, American singer and actress
  1934   – Pierre Richard, French actor, director, and screenwriter
  1934   – John Standing, English actor
  1934   – Sam Trimble, Australian cricketer (d. 2019)
1935 – Cliff Fletcher, Canadian businessman 
  1935   – Andreas Stamatiadis, Greek footballer and coach
1936 – Anita Gillette, American actress and singer
  1936   – Alan Hodgkinson, English footballer and coach (d. 2015)
1937 – David Anderson, Canadian journalist, lawyer, and politician
  1937   – David Behrman, American composer and producer
  1937   – Ian Deans, Canadian politician (d. 2016)
  1937   – Boris Rõtov, Estonian chess player (d. 1987)
1939 – Seán Brady, Irish cardinal
  1939   – Trevor McDonald, Trinidadian-English journalist and academic
  1939   – Billy Joe Shaver, American singer-songwriter and guitarist (d. 2020)
  1939   – Eric Weissberg, American singer, banjo player, and multi-instrumentalist (d. 2020)
1940 – Bruce Beresford, Australian director and producer
1942 – Lesley Turner Bowrey, Australian tennis player
  1942   – Barbara George, American R&B singer-songwriter (d. 2006)
  1942   – Robert Squirrel Lester, American soul singer (d. 2010) 
1943 – Woody Peoples, American football player (d. 2010)
1944 – Kevin Ayers, English singer-songwriter and guitarist (d. 2013)
1945 – Bob Balaban, American actor, director, and producer
  1945   – Russell Brookes, English race car driver (d. 2019)
  1945   – Suzanne Farrell, American ballerina and educator
  1945   – Gary Loizzo, American guitarist, singer, recording engineer, and record producer (d. 2016)
  1945   – Nigel Terry, British stage and film actor (d. 2015)
1946 – Masoud Barzani, Iranian-Kurdish politician, President of Iraqi Kurdistan
  1946   – Lesley Ann Warren, American actress 
1947 – Carol Moseley Braun, American lawyer and politician, United States Ambassador to New Zealand
  1947   – Katharine Hamnett, English fashion designer
1948 – Earl Blumenauer, American politician, U.S. Representative from Oregon
  1948   – Barry Hay, Indian-born Dutch rock musician
  1948   – Mike Jorgensen, American baseball player and manager
  1948   – Pierre Reid, Canadian educator and politician
  1948   – Joey Spampinato, American singer-songwriter and bass player
1949 – Scott Asheton, American drummer (d. 2014)
  1949   – Paul Pasqualoni, American football player and coach
  1949   – Bill Spooner, American guitarist and songwriter
1950 – Hasely Crawford, Trinidadian runner
  1950   – Jeff Thomson, Australian cricketer
1951 – Umaru Musa Yar'Adua, Nigerian businessman and politician, 13th President of Nigeria (d. 2010)
1953 – Kathie Lee Gifford, American talk show host, singer, and actress
  1953   – James "J.T." Taylor, American R&B singer-songwriter 
1954 – James Cameron, Canadian director, producer, and screenwriter
  1954   – George Galloway, Scottish-English politician and broadcaster
1955 – James Reilly, Irish surgeon and politician, Minister for Children and Youth Affairs
1956 – Vahan Hovhannisyan, Armenian soldier and politician (d. 2014)
1957 – Laura Innes, American actress and director 
  1957   – R. R. Patil, Indian lawyer and politician, Deputy Chief Minister of Maharashtra (d. 2015)
1958 – Madonna, American singer-songwriter, producer, actress, and director
  1958   – Angela Bassett, American actress
  1958   – José Luis Clerc, Argentinian tennis player and coach
1959 – Marc Sergeant, Belgian cyclist and manager
1960 – Rosita Baltazar, Belizean choreographer, dancer, and dance instructor (d. 2015)
  1960   – Timothy Hutton, American actor, producer and director
  1960   – Franz Welser-Möst, Austrian-American conductor and director
1961 – Christian Okoye, American football player
1962 – Steve Carell, American actor, director, producer, and screenwriter
1963 – Aloísio Pires Alves, Brazilian footballer and manager
  1963   – Christine Cavanaugh, American voice artist (d. 2014)
1964 – Jimmy Arias, American tennis player and sportscaster
1966 – Eddie Olczyk, American ice hockey player, coach, and commentator
1967 – Mark Coyne, Australian rugby league player
  1967   – Ulrika Jonsson, Swedish journalist, actress, and author
1968 – Mateja Svet, Slovenian skier
  1968   – Wolfgang Tillmans, German photographer
  1968   – Arvind Kejriwal, Indian civil servant and politician, 7th Chief Minister of Delhi
1970 – Bonnie Bernstein, American journalist and sportscaster
  1970   – Manisha Koirala, Nepalese actress in Indian films
1971 – Stefan Klos, German footballer 
1972 – Stan Lazaridis, Australian footballer
1974 – Shivnarine Chanderpaul, Guyanese cricketer
  1974   – Krisztina Egerszegi, Hungarian swimmer
  1974   – Iván Hurtado, Ecuadorian footballer and politician
  1974   – Didier Cuche, Swiss skier
1975 – Didier Agathe, French footballer
  1975   – Jonatan Johansson, Finnish footballer, coach, and manager
  1975   – Taika Waititi, New Zealand director, screenwriter and actor
1979 – Paul Gallacher, Scottish footballer
  1979   – Ian Moran, Australian cricketer 
1980 – Emerson Ramos Borges, Brazilian footballer
  1980   – Bob Hardy, English bass player
  1980   – Piet Rooijakkers, Dutch cyclist 
1981 – Roque Santa Cruz, Paraguayan footballer
1982 – Joleon Lescott, English footballer
1983 – Nikolaos Zisis, Greek basketball player
1984 – Matteo Anesi, Italian speed skater
  1984   – Candice Dupree, American basketball player
  1984   – Konstantin Vassiljev, Estonian footballer
1985 – Cristin Milioti, American actress
1986 – Yu Darvish, Japanese baseball player
1987 – Carey Price, Canadian ice hockey player
  1987   – Eri Kitamura, Japanese voice actress and singer.
1988 – Ismaïl Aissati, Moroccan footballer
1989 – Wang Hao, Chinese race walker
  1989   – Moussa Sissoko, French footballer
1990 – Godfrey Oboabona, Nigerian footballer
1991 – José Eduardo de Araújo, Brazilian footballer
  1991   – Evanna Lynch, Irish actress
  1991   – Jeffery Lamar Williams, American rapper, singer and songwriter
1992 – Diego Schwartzman, Argentinian tennis player
1993 – Cameron Monaghan, American actor and model
1996 – Caeleb Dressel, American swimmer
1997 – Greyson Chance, American musician
1999 – Karen Chen, American figure skater

Deaths

Pre-1600
AD 79 – Empress Ma, Chinese Han dynasty consort (b. 40)
 856 – Theutbald I, bishop of Langres
 963 – Marianos Argyros, Byzantine general (b. 944)
1027 – George I of Georgia (b. 998)
1153 – Bernard de Tremelay, fourth Grand Master of the Knights Templar 
1225 – Hōjō Masako, Japanese regent and onna-bugeisha (b. 1156)
1258 – Theodore II Laskaris, Byzantine-Greek emperor (b. 1222)
1285 – Philip I, Count of Savoy (b. 1207)
1297 – John II of Trebizond (b. 1262)
1327 – Roch, French saint (b. 1295)
1339 – Azzone Visconti, founder of the state of Milan (b. 1302)
1358 – Albert II, Duke of Austria (b. 1298)
1419 – Wenceslaus IV of Bohemia (b. 1361)
1443 – Ashikaga Yoshikatsu, Japanese shōgun (b. 1434)
1492 – Beatrice of Silva, Dominican nun
1518 – Loyset Compère, French composer (b. 1445)
1532 – John, Elector of Saxony (b. 1468)

1601–1900
1661 – Thomas Fuller, English historian and author (b. 1608)
1678 – Andrew Marvell, English poet and author (b. 1621)
1705 – Jacob Bernoulli, Swiss mathematician and theorist (b. 1654)
1733 – Matthew Tindal, English philosopher and author (b. 1657)
1791 – Charles-François de Broglie, marquis de Ruffec, French soldier and diplomat (b. 1719)
1836 – Marc-Antoine Parseval, French mathematician and theorist (b. 1755)
1855 – Henry Colburn, English publisher (b. 1785)
1861 – Ranavalona I, Queen consort of Kingdom of Madagascar and then sovereign (b. 1778)
1878 – Richard Upjohn, English-American architect (b. 1802)
1886 – Sri Ramakrishna Paramahamsa, Indian mystic and philosopher (b. 1836)
1887 – Webster Paulson, English civil engineer (b. 1837)
1888 – John Pemberton, American pharmacist and chemist, invented Coca-Cola (b. 1831)
1893 – Jean-Martin Charcot, French neurologist and academic (b. 1825)
1899 – Robert Bunsen, German chemist and academic (b. 1811)
1900 – José Maria de Eça de Queirós, Portuguese journalist and author (b. 1845)

1901–present
1904 – Prentiss Ingraham, American soldier and author (b. 1843)
1911 – Patrick Francis Moran, Irish-Australian cardinal (b. 1830)
1914 – Carl Theodor Schulz, German-Norwegian gardener (b. 1835)
1916 – George Scott, English footballer (b. 1885)
1920 – Henry Daglish, Australian politician, 6th Premier of Western Australia (b. 1866)
1921 – Peter I of Serbia (b. 1844)
1938 – Andrej Hlinka, Slovak priest, journalist, and politician (b. 1864)
  1938   – Robert Johnson, American singer-songwriter and guitarist (b. 1911)
1945 – Takijirō Ōnishi, Japanese admiral (b. 1891)
1948 – Babe Ruth, American baseball player and coach (b. 1895)
1949 – Margaret Mitchell, American journalist and author (b. 1900)
1952 – Lydia Field Emmet, American painter and academic (b. 1866)
1956 – Bela Lugosi, Hungarian-American actor (b. 1882)
1957 – Irving Langmuir, American chemist and physicist, Nobel Prize laureate (b. 1881)
1958 – Jacob M. Lomakin, Soviet Consul General in New York City,  journalist and economist (b. 1904)
1959 – William Halsey, Jr., American admiral (b. 1882)
  1959   – Wanda Landowska, Polish-French harpsichord player (b. 1879)
1961 – Abdul Haq, Pakistani linguist and scholar (b. 1870)
1971 – Spyros Skouras, Greek-American businessman (b. 1893)
1972 – Pierre Brasseur, French actor and screenwriter (b. 1905)
1973 – Selman Waksman, Ukrainian-American biochemist and microbiologist, Nobel Prize laureate (b. 1888)
1977 – Elvis Presley, American singer, guitarist, and actor  (b. 1935)
1978 – Alidius Tjarda van Starkenborgh Stachouwer, Dutch soldier and politician, Governor-General of the Dutch East Indies (b. 1888)
1979 – John Diefenbaker, Canadian lawyer and politician, 13th Prime Minister of Canada (b. 1895)
1983 – Earl Averill, American baseball player (b. 1902)
1984 – Duško Radović, Serbian children's writer, poet, journalist, aphorist and TV editor (b. 1922)
1986 – Ronnie Aird, English cricketer and administrator (b. 1902)
  1986   – Jaime Sáenz, Bolivian author and poet (b. 1921)
1989 – Amanda Blake, American actress (b. 1929)
1990 – Pat O'Connor, New Zealand wrestler and trainer (b. 1925)
1991 – Luigi Zampa, Italian director and screenwriter (b. 1905)
1992 – Mark Heard, American singer-songwriter, guitarist, and producer (b. 1951)
1993 – Stewart Granger, English-American actor (b. 1913)
1997 – Nusrat Fateh Ali Khan, Pakistani musician and Qawwali singer (b. 1948)
  1997   – Sultan Ahmad Nanupuri, Bangladeshi Islamic scholar and teacher (b. 1914)
1998 – Phil Leeds, American actor (b. 1916)
  1998   – Dorothy West, American journalist and author (b. 1907)
2002 – Abu Nidal, Palestinian terrorist leader (b. 1937)
  2002   – Jeff Corey, American actor (b. 1914)
  2002   – John Roseboro, American baseball player and coach (b. 1933)
2003 – Idi Amin, Ugandan field marshal and politician, 3rd President of Uganda (b. 1928)
2004 – Ivan Hlinka, Czech ice hockey player and coach (b. 1950)
  2004   – Balanadarajah Iyer, Sri Lankan journalist and poet (b. 1957)
  2004   – Carl Mydans, American photographer and journalist (b. 1907)
  2004   – Robert Quiroga, American boxer (b. 1969)
2005 – Vassar Clements, American fiddler (b. 1928)
  2005   – Tonino Delli Colli, Italian cinematographer (b. 1922)
  2005   – William Corlett, English novelist and playwright (b. 1938)
  2005   – Frère Roger, Swiss monk and mystic (b. 1915)
2006 – Alfredo Stroessner, Paraguayan general and dictator; 46th President of Paraguay (b. 1912)
2007 – Bahaedin Adab, Iranian engineer and politician (b. 1945)
2008 – Dorival Caymmi, Brazilian singer-songwriter and actor (b. 1914)
  2008   – Ronnie Drew, Irish musician, folk singer and actor (b. 1934)
  2008   – Masanobu Fukuoka, Japanese farmer and author (b. 1913)
2010 – Dimitrios Ioannidis, Greek general (b. 1923)
2011 – Mihri Belli, Turkish activist and politician (b. 1916)
2012 – Princess Lalla Amina of Morocco (b. 1954)
  2012   – Martine Franck, Belgian photographer and director (b. 1938)
  2012   – Abune Paulos, Ethiopian patriarch (b. 1935)
  2012   – William Windom, American actor (b. 1923)
2013 – David Rees, Welsh mathematician and academic (b. 1918)
2014 – Patrick Aziza, Nigerian general and politician, Governor of Kebbi State (b. 1947)
  2014   – Vsevolod Nestayko, Ukrainian author (b. 1930)
  2014   – Mario Oriani-Ambrosini, Italian-South African lawyer and politician (b. 1960)
  2014   – Peter Scholl-Latour, German journalist, author, and academic (b. 1924)
2015 – Jacob Bekenstein, Mexican-American physicist, astronomer, and academic (b. 1947)
  2015   – Anna Kashfi, British actress (b. 1934)
  2015   – Shuja Khanzada, Pakistani colonel and politician (b. 1943)
  2015   – Mile Mrkšić, Serb general (b. 1947)
2016 – João Havelange, Brazilian water polo player, lawyer, and businessman (b. 1916)
  2016   – John McLaughlin, American television personality (b. 1927)
2018 – Aretha Franklin, American singer-songwriter (b. 1942)
  2018   – Atal Bihari Vajpayee, Indian prime minister (b. 1924)
  2018   – Wakako Yamauchi, American-Japanese writer (b. 1924)
2019 – Peter Fonda,  American actor, director, and screenwriter. (b. 1940)
  2019   – Richard Williams, Canadian-British animator (b. 1933)
  2021 – Sean Lock, English comedian and actor (b. 1963)

Holidays and observances
Bennington Battle Day (Vermont, United States)
Children's Day (Paraguay)
Christian feast day:
 Ana Petra Pérez Florido
 Armel (Armagillus)
 Diomedes of Tarsus
Roch
Stephen I of Hungary
Translation of the Acheiropoietos icon from Edessa to Constantinople. (Eastern Orthodox Church)
August 16 (Eastern Orthodox liturgics)
Gozan no Okuribi (Kyoto, Japan)
National Airborne Day (United States)
Restoration Day (Dominican Republic)
The first day of the Independence Days, celebrates the independence of Gabon from France in 1960.
Xicolatada (Palau-de-Cerdagne, France)

References

External links

 
 
 

Days of the year
August